A by-election was held for the New South Wales Legislative Assembly electorate of The Glebe on 22 May 1873 because George Allen had been appointed Minister of Justice and Public Instruction in the first Parkes ministry. Such ministerial by-elections were usually uncontested.

John Young was a builder, most notable for building St Mary's Cathedral in Sydney and the Johnston Street group of houses in Annandale.

Dates

Result

George Allen was appointed Minister of Justice and Public Instruction in the first Parkes ministry.

See also
Electoral results for the district of Glebe
List of New South Wales state by-elections

References

1873 elections in Australia
New South Wales state by-elections
1870s in New South Wales